Mocean may refer to:
 Mocean 8, a rock band from Boston, Massachusetts
 Mocean Worker, electronic music artist Adam Dorn
 Mocean Laboratories, Swedish automotive electronics development company
 mOcean, Advertising Agency